Filipaina is a surname. Notable people with the surname include:

Alf Filipaina, New Zealand politician
Olsen Filipaina (1957–2022), New Zealand rugby league player